{{Speciesbox
|image = Podolepis gracilis - Flickr - Kevin Thiele.jpg
|genus = Podolepis
|species = gracilis
|authority = Graham
|synonyms =
Podolepis angustifolia Anon.
Podolepis filiformis Steetz
Podolepis rosea Steetz
Podolepis rosea var. mollissima Steetz
Podolepis spenceri Ewart
Scalia gracilis Kuntze
Stylolepis gracilis Lehm.Stylolepis gracilis var. arachnoidea Lehm.Stylolepis gracilis var. glabra Lehm.
|synonyms_ref=
}}Podolepis gracilis'' (common name slender podolepis) is a slender, perennial herb native to Western Australia, belonging to the Asteraceae family.

Taxonomy
The species was first described in 1828 by Robert Graham  based on plant material grown from seed said to have been collected in New South Wales and sent to England by Charles Fraser, the NSW colonial botanist.

Description
Graham described the plant as follows:

References

External links
Podolepis gracilis occurrence data from the Australasian Virtual Herbarium

gracilis
Flora of Western Australia